Zohra Aghamirova (born 8 August 2001) is an Azerbaijani rhythmic gymnast. She competed at the 2020 Summer Olympics.

Career

Junior
Aghamirova started the season at Miss Valentine in Tartu, where she won bronze medal in All-around and qualified to three finals. She won silver medal with Clubs and brone medals with Rope and Ball. She won gold medal in All-around at the 2016 Azerbaijani Junior National Championships. She also won gold with Rope, silver with Ball and bronze with Clubs. She competed at the 2016 European Championships in Holon, Israel, where she and her teammates Ilaha Mammadova and Veronika Hudis won 8th place in Team competition. She placed 15th in Clubs and 37th in Ball Qualifications.

Senior
Aghamirova won the gold medal in the team competition with Marina Durunda and Zhala Piriyeva at the 2017 Islamic Solidarity Games which were hosted in her home country Azerbaijan. She placed twenty-seventh in all-around qualifications at the 2017 World Championships in Pesaro, Italy, where she made her World Championship debut.

In 2018, Aghamirova competed at the European Championships in Guadalajara, Spain, where she finished eighteenth in all-around. At the 2018 World Championships in Sofia, Bulgaria she qualified to individual all-around final, finishing in twenty-fourth place.

In June 2019, Aghamirova represented Azerbaijan at the 2019 European Games in Minsk, Belarus where she finished eighth place in the all-around competition. In July, she took part in the 2019 Summer Universiade in Naples, Italy and won a silver medal in all-around. She qualified to all four apparatus finals, and she won another silver medal in clubs. She competed at the 2019 World Championships in Baku, Azerbaijan, where she finished sixteenth place in the all-around final.

At the 2020 Olympic Games, Aghamirova finished eighteenth in the qualification round for the individual all-around.

Routine music information

References

External links

2001 births
Living people
Azerbaijani rhythmic gymnasts
Universiade medalists in gymnastics
Medalists at the 2019 Summer Universiade
Universiade silver medalists for Azerbaijan
European Games competitors for Azerbaijan
Gymnasts at the 2019 European Games
Olympic gymnasts of Azerbaijan
Gymnasts at the 2020 Summer Olympics
21st-century Azerbaijani women
Competitors at the 2022 World Games